Malambo may refer to:

Places
Malambo, Cotabato, an inactive volcano on Mindanao, The Philippines
Malambo, Atlántico, Colombia
Malambo, Tanzania
Malambo (constituency). a Zambian parliamentary constituency

Films
Malambo (1942 film), a 1942 film 
Malambo (1984 film), a 1984 film by Milan Dor
Malambo, the Good Man, 2018 Argentine black-and-white drama film

Other
Malambo (dance), an Argentine folk step dance
"Malambo No. 1", a song from Mambo! album by Yma Sumac
Croton malambo, a tree of genus Croton, or its bark